Simon Illingworth (born 10 November 1967) is an Australian former police officer and the councillor for Coastal Ward, Shire of Corangamite. He is now a farmer, business owner and CFA member.

Career
He served in many different roles throughout his time with the Victoria Police, but his most significant contribution was with the Victoria Police Ethical Standards Department (the Victoria Police version of Internal Affairs) where he helped weed out and prosecute corrupt police officers.

After retiring from the force he has written a book about his experiences entitled "Filthy Rat", selling 9,000 copies before being out of print in 2007. He also appeared on "Australian Story" in May 2004 to tell his unique story and offer insight on the Melbourne underworld and police corruption.

Due to the upsurge of interest in the 1995–2004 gangland war in Melbourne sparked by the recent Australian Underbelly TV series, publisher Fontaine Press has re-released "Filthy Rat" in May 2008.

Simon and his family appeared on "Australian Story" on 20 April 2015 alongside the Lord Mayor of Melbourne Robert Doyle recounting their experiences during the anti-corruption investigations.

Simon identified and warned of the rising number of international tourist driver caused road crashes and fatalities along the Great Ocean road since 2016; this has become a National issue.   As a CFA member Simon fought the St Patricks Day fires in south West Victoria in 2018 and also responded to the Sherbrook beach rescue where two surf life savers lost their lives attempting to rescue a drowning tourist in Easter 2019 in big seas.

Ethical Strength
Simon currently runs his own company Ethical Strength with the mission to help people faced with moral and ethical dilemmas.

See also
Office of Police Integrity

References

External links
 2004 Perelberg Award
 Police investigator: I was bashed
 Former judge says Vic police are corrupt
 The courage of a "filthy rat"
 Office of Police Integrity website
 Ombudsman Victoria
 Whistling In The Dark
 Why our police must face a probe
 TV man linked to sex case inquiry
 Saxton Speaker Bureau, Simon Illingworth
 OpinionExtra: Sunday Herald Sun, 30 May 2004
 Living a nightmare
 Whistleblower cop claims union bullying

 https://www.standard.net.au/story/6181161/we-are-playing-high-stakes-double-drowning-first-responder-nominated-for-bravery-award/?cs=12
 https://www.standard.net.au/story/6187931/council-backs-volunteer-pay-motion-illingworth-declines-bravery-award/?cs=12

1967 births
Australian non-fiction writers
Living people
Police officers from Melbourne